Mejdlaya, Mejdlaiya, is a village in Zgharta District, in the Northern Governorate of Lebanon.

The population is Maronite and Greek Orthodox Christian.

References

External links
 Ehden Family Tree

Populated places in the North Governorate
Zgharta District
Maronite Christian communities in Lebanon
Eastern Orthodox Christian communities in Lebanon